Robert Arnold may refer to:

Robert Arnold (basketball) (born 1988), basketball player
Robert Arnold (MP) (died c. 1408), English politician, MP for Winchelsea
Jake Arnold (athlete) (Robert Jacob Arnold, born 1984), American decathlete
Robert O. Arnold, chairman of the Georgia Board of Regents during integration
Robert Sterling Arnold (1905–2003), American shape note music publisher, singer, composer, and singing school teacher
Bob Arnold (died 1998), actor
Rob Arnold (born 1980), Chimaira member

See also